para-Methoxy-N-methylamphetamine (also known as PMMA, Red Mitsubishi), chemically known as methyl-MA, 4-methoxy-N-methylamphetamine, 4-MMA) or (4-PMDA, as listed to its original physical name) is a stimulant and psychedelic drug closely related to the amphetamine-class serotonergic drug para-methoxyamphetamine (PMA). PMMA is the 4-methoxy analog of methamphetamine. Little is known about the pharmacological properties, metabolism, and toxicity of PMMA; because of its structural similarity to PMA, which has known toxicity in humans, it is thought to have considerable potential to cause harmful side effects or death in overdose. In the early 2010s, a number of deaths in users of the drug MDMA were linked to misrepresented tablets and capsules of PMMA.

Its effects in humans are reputedly similar to those of PMA, but slightly more empathogenic in nature. It has a reduced tendency to produce severe hyperthermia at low dosages, but at higher dosages side effects and risk of death become similar to those of PMA.

The synthesis and effects of PMMA were described by American experimental chemist Alexander Shulgin in his book PiHKAL, where it is referred to by the name "methyl-MA", as the N-methylated form of 4-MA (PMA). Shulgin reported that PMMA produces an increase in blood pressure and in heart rate, at doses above 100 mg, but causes no psychoactive effects at these levels.

Recreational use

PMMA has been found in tablets and capsules of the MDMA sold as "ecstasy". A number of deaths have been attributed to tablets sold as ecstasy that contained other substances, such as PMMA's structural analog, PMA. Death can occur when an ecstasy user believes they are consuming recreational doses of MDMA, when they are in fact consuming a lethal dose of another substance with similar effects. PMA is of particular concern because it not only causes a release of serotonin but also acts as a monoamine oxidase inhibitor (MAOI); if it is used in combination with MDMA or another MDMA-like substance, serotonin syndrome can result.

PMMA can be detected with reagent testing kits.

Deaths

In January 2011, the Norwegian Broadcasting Corporation reported that Norway had seen 12 deaths related to PMMA over the course of six months. In March 2011, Dutch media reported that there had been four deaths in the province of Limburg since November 2010. In April 2011, Icelandic media reported the death of a young woman that may have been connected to PMMA.

In 2011, four deaths were recorded in Scotland as a result of ecstasy tablets which also contained PMMA.

In January 2012, a number of ecstasy-related deaths in Canada in the previous year were linked to PMMA overdoses.  In the single year, approximately 45 exposures occurred, resulting in 21 deaths.  Cases were centred primarily in Calgary and Vancouver.

In September 2012, the deaths of two men in County Cork, Ireland, have been linked to PMMA overdoses. In the same month, the death of a man in Queensland, Australia was attributed to PMMA.

In June 2013 a PMMA-related death occurred in the Dutch city of 's-Hertogenbosch.
Two months later, In August 2013, another possibly PMMA-related death occurred in the nearby town of Sliedrecht.

In January 2015 in the UK four people died, suspected of taking ecstasy containing PMMA. In the same month, in Sweden, another man died from ecstasy laced with PMMA.

In May 2015 a young woman died in Dublin, Ireland, after taking what is suspected to be PMMA.

In April 2016 four young Argentines and one Uruguayan died during a massive rave called "Time Warp" in Buenos Aires and five more were hospitalized. PMMA was found in their bodies.

Legal status

United States
On June 25, 2021 the DEA finalized a rule placing PMMA on the Controlled Substance Act federal Schedule as a Schedule I substance effective July 26, 2021.

United Kingdom
PMMA is controlled as a Schedule 1, Class A drug in the UK.

See also 

 para-Methoxyamphetamine (PMA)
 2-Methoxymethamphetamine (Methoxyphenamine)
 3-Methoxymethamphetamine (MMMA)
 4-Fluoromethamphetamine (4-FMA)
 4-Methylmethamphetamine (4-MMA)
 4-Methoxymethcathinone (bk-PMMA)
 Venlafaxine

References

External links 
 Methyl-MA entry in PiHKAL
 Methyl-MA entry in PiHKAL • info
 Dutch article by TRIMBOS institute from 31-03-2011 
 Icelandic arictle by Mbl news(Mbl.is) from 30-04-2011

Monoamine oxidase inhibitors
Phenol ethers
Designer drugs
Serotonin releasing agents
Methamphetamines